The 1940 Ohio State Buckeyes football team represented Ohio State University in the 1940 Big Ten Conference football season. The Buckeyes compiled a 4–4 record and were outscored 99–113.

Schedule

Coaching staff
 Francis Schmidt, head coach, seventh year

1941 NFL draftees

References

Ohio State
Ohio State Buckeyes football seasons
Ohio State Buckeyes football